The 1971 British Hard Court Championships was a combined men's and women's tennis tournament played on outdoor clay courts at The West Hants Club in Bournemouth, England. The event was part of the 1971 Pepsi-Cola Grand Prix and categorized as B class. The tournament was held from 16 to 22 May 1971. Gerald Battrick and Margaret Court won the singles titles.

Finals

Men's singles
 Gerald Battrick defeated  Željko Franulović 6–3, 6–2, 5–7, 6–0

Women's singles
 Margaret Court defeated  Evonne Goolagong 7–5, 6–1

Men's doubles
 Bill Bowrey /  Owen Davidson defeated  Patricio Cornejo /  Jaime Fillol 8–6, 6–2, 3–6, 4–6, 6–4

Women's doubles
 Mary–Ann Curtis /  Françoise Dürr defeated  Margaret Court /  Evonne Goolagong 6–3, 5–7, 6–4

References

External links
 ITF Tournament details

British Hard Court Championships
British Hard Court Championships
Clay court tennis tournaments
1971 in English tennis
May 1971 sports events in the United Kingdom